Kim Clijsters was the defending champion, but did not compete this year due to an injury on her left wrist.

Second-seeded Alicia Molik won the title by defeating Dinara Safina 6–3, 6–4 in the final.

Seeds
The top two seeds received a bye into the second round.

Draw

Finals

Top half

Bottom half

Qualifying

Seeds

Qualifiers

Qualifying draw

First qualifier

Second qualifier

Third qualifier

Fourth qualifier

References

External links
 Official results archive (ITF)
 Official results archive (WTA)

2004 Singles
SEAT Open - Singles
2004 in Luxembourgian tennis